Kiszkowo  is a village in Gniezno County, Greater Poland Voivodeship, in west-central Poland. It is the seat of the gmina (administrative district) called Gmina Kiszkowo.

The village has an approximate population of 1,000. It has a church which lies on the Wooden Churches Trail around Puszcza Zielonka.

References

Kiszkowo